Pura Vida Conspiracy is the sixth studio album by Gypsy-punk band Gogol Bordello. It was released in July 2013 under ATO Records.

Track list

References

2013 albums
ATO Records albums
Gogol Bordello albums
Albums recorded at Sonic Ranch